Gordon Touw Ngie Tjouw (born 9 June 1985) is an Olympic swimmer from Suriname. He swam for Suriname at the 2004 and 2008 Olympics.

He swam and studied at the USA's Indian River Community College.

References

Living people
Swimmers at the 2004 Summer Olympics
Swimmers at the 2008 Summer Olympics
Olympic swimmers of Suriname
Swimmers at the 2003 Pan American Games
Swimmers at the 2007 Pan American Games
Pan American Games competitors for Suriname
Surinamese male swimmers
Indian River State College alumni
1985 births